Svetlana Konstantinovna Kolesnichenko (born 20 September 1993) is a Russian competitor in synchronised swimming. She is a three-time Olympic champion.

Career
She has won 16 gold medals at the World Aquatics Championships. She also won 11 gold medals at the LEN European Aquatics Championships, as well as 2 golds at the 2013 Summer Universiade.

In 2018, Kolesnichenko and Varvara Subbotina won the gold medal in both the duet technical routine and duet free routine at the 2018 European Aquatics Championships.

References

External links
 
 
 
 

1993 births
Living people
Russian synchronized swimmers
Olympic synchronized swimmers of Russia
Olympic medalists in synchronized swimming
Olympic gold medalists for Russia
Olympic gold medalists for the Russian Olympic Committee athletes
Synchronized swimmers at the 2016 Summer Olympics
Synchronized swimmers at the 2020 Summer Olympics
Medalists at the 2016 Summer Olympics
Medalists at the 2020 Summer Olympics
World Aquatics Championships medalists in synchronised swimming
Synchronized swimmers at the 2011 World Aquatics Championships
Synchronized swimmers at the 2013 World Aquatics Championships
Synchronized swimmers at the 2015 World Aquatics Championships
Synchronized swimmers at the 2017 World Aquatics Championships
Artistic swimmers at the 2019 World Aquatics Championships
Universiade medalists in synchronized swimming
Universiade gold medalists for Russia
European Aquatics Championships medalists in synchronised swimming
People from Gatchina
Medalists at the 2013 Summer Universiade
Sportspeople from Leningrad Oblast